Mike Berry (born Michael Hubert Bourne, 24 September 1942) is an English singer and actor. He is known for his top ten hits "Don't You Think It's Time" (1963) and "The Sunshine of Your Smile" (1980) in a singing career spanning nearly 60 years. He became an actor in the 1970s, and was best known for his appearances as Mr. Spooner on the British sitcom Are You Being Served? in the early 1980s.

Early life
Berry was born in Northampton. His parents grew up in Rhodesia but met in England and his mother was an amateur actress and singer. Six months after his birth his mother moved with him to North Wales for two years. The family then moved to Stoke Newington where he attended William Pattern Primary School and passed his eleven plus exam, winning a scholarship to Hackney Downs Grocers' School. He left the school aged 16 without qualifications to become an apprentice compositor.

Singer
Berry was a fan of skiffle and rock and roll music as a teenager and he formed his own skiffle group called "The Rebels" and then introduced electric guitars as "Kenny Lord and the Statesmen." Joe Meek became their recording manager and producer, and he signed up a group called the Stormers as his new back-up band, naming the new group "Mike Berry and the Outlaws."

He had three hits in the 1960s in the UK Singles Chart, his most successful being "Don't You Think It's Time", reaching No. 6 in January 1963.  His "Tribute To Buddy Holly" is also noted for having been banned by the BBC for being "morbid." The hit singles were all produced by Joe Meek.

In the mid-1970s he returned to the charts in the Netherlands and Belgium, as pirate radio station Radio Mi Amigo and Radio Veronica played his new record material, released on Dutch record label Pink Elephant Records. "Don't Be Cruel" made No. 14 in the Dutch Nationale Hitparade in May 1975. His next record, a remake of his 1960 debut song "Tribute to Buddy Holly", hit No. 2 in October of that same year. In 1977, "I'm A Rocker," released on Flemish record label Scramble Records (owned by Radio Mi Amigo DJ Norbert), failed to chart.

In 1980, he had a chart success in the UK, with "The Sunshine of Your Smile," a cover version of a romantic song which was produced by Chas Hodges; this had originally been written before the First World War and recorded by Jessie Broughton in about 1915. In 1985, his song "Everyone's A Wally" was included as the b-side to the video game by Mikro-Gen of the same name. His most recent CD was About Time Too!, recorded in Nashville, Tennessee with The Crickets and released on the UK Rollercoaster Records label, Berry's label of choice since their reissue of Joe Meek productions and new material from the 1990s.

In 1988, Berry co-wrote "This is the Kiss" with Mel Simpson which was chosen to be among the final eight songs in "A Song for Europe" (the UK selection vehicle for the Eurovision Song Contest) performed by Two-Che. The song placed second with 73,785 televotes.

In 2016, Berry auditioned for the fifth series of The Voice but was not successful.

In 2017, Berry went on a UK tour with The Solid Gold Rock'n'Roll Show, which also featured Eden Kane, Marty Wilde, Mark Wynter and the Wildcats. In 2019, he toured again with The Solid Gold Rock'n'Roll Show, alongside Marty Wilde, Charlie Gracie, Nancy Ann Lee (Little Miss Sixties) and the Wildcats.

Acting career
In the 1970s, Berry developed a career as an actor and he appeared in many television commercials. In 1979, he was cast as the father (Mr. Peters) of the two children in the TV version of the Worzel Gummidge books, along with Jon Pertwee and Una Stubbs. In 1981, he replaced Trevor Bannister's character (Mr. Lucas) in the British sitcom Are You Being Served? and stayed until the end of the show's run in 1985. Since the death of Nicholas Smith in December 2015, he has been the lone surviving actor from the show who played a major recurring character. Berry also starred in a series of commercials for Blue Riband in the 1980s.
His most recent film work was acting in Julie and the Cadillacs (1999).

Family
His brother is the actor, performer and activist Bette Bourne.

Discography

Singles 
"Will You Love Me Tomorrow" / "My Baby Doll" (with The Outlaws – Decca 11314 – 1961)
"Tribute to Buddy Holly" / "What's the Matter" (with The Outlaws – HMV 912 – 1961) – UK No. 24
"It's Just a Matter of Time" / "Little Boy Blue" (with The Admirals (Outlaws) – HMV 979 – 1962)
"Every Little Kiss" / "How Many Times" (HMV 1042 – 1962)
"Don't You Think it's Time" / "Loneliness" (with The Outlaws – HMV 1105 – 1962) – UK No. 6
"My Little Baby" / "You'll Do It You'll Fall in Love" (with The Outlaws – HMV 1142 – 1963) – UK No. 34
"It Really Doesn't Matter" / "Try a Little Bit Harder" (HMV 1194 – 1963)
"Intro" / "Brown Eyed Handsome Man" (Graham Dean / The Innocents – Columbia 1536 – 1963)
"My Little Baby" / "More Than I Can Say" (with The Innocents – Columbia 1536 – 1963)
"La Bamba" / "Don't You Think it's Time" (with The Innocents – Columbia 1536 – 1963)
"On My Mind" / "This Little Girl" (with The Innocents – HMV 1257 – 1964)
"Lovesick" / "Letters of Love" (with The Innocents – HMV 1284 – 1964)
"Who Will It Be" / "Talk" (with The Innocents – HMV 1314 – 1964)
"Two Lovers" / "Don't Try to Stand in My Way" (HMV 1362 – 1964)
"That's All I Ever Want from You" / "She Didn't Care" (HMV 1449 – 1965)
"It Comes and Goes" / "Gonna Fall in Love" (HMV 1484 – 1965)
"Warm Baby" / "Just Thought I´d Phone" (HMV 1530 – 1966)
"Raining in My Heart" / "Eyes" (Polydor 56182 – 1967)
"Can't You Hear My Heartbeat" / "Alice" (D-Metronome – 1967)
"Don't Be Cruel" / "It's All Over" (Pink Elephant Records – 1975)
"Tribute to Buddy Holly" (remake) / "Dial My Up" (Pink Elephant Records – 1975)
"I'm a Rocker" / "It's a Hard Hard Hard World" (Scramble Records – 1977)
"Don't Ever Change" (Polydor – 1978)
"The Sunshine of Your Smile" (Polydor – 1980) – UK No. 9
"If I Could Only Make You Care" (Polydor – 1980) – UK No. 37
"Memories" (Polydor – 1981) – UK No. 55
"Diana" (Polydor – 1981)
"What'll I Do" (Polydor – 1982)
"Everyone's a Wally" (B-side to cassette release of computer game – 1985)
"It's Time For Mike Berry – Vinyl EP" – (Rollercoaster Records – 1990)
"Sounds of the Sixties" (Rollercoaster Records – 1992)
"Rock'n'Roll Daze" (Rollercoaster Records – 1998)
"Keep Your Hands To Yourself – Live in Sweden" (Rollercoaster Records – 2001)
"About Time Too! – with The Crickets, Recorded in Nashville" (Rollercoaster Records -2005)
"Before I Grow Too Old – CD EP" – (Rollercoaster Records – 2006)
"Hi There Darlin'! Merry Christmas" – Mr. Bert Spooner with instrumental accompaniment by Mike Berry & The Outlaws – (Rollercoaster Records – 2007)
"Sunshine of Your Smile – Hits and Memories from the 1980s" – (Rollercoaster Records – 2016)
"Drift Away" – (Rollercoaster Records – 2019)

References

External links 
 
 
 
 [ Mike Berry biography @ Allmusic.com]
 Mike Berry discography
 
 Interview with Mike Berry, The Spectrum, Accessed July 6, 2017

1942 births
Living people
English male television actors
English male singers
English pop singers
People from Northampton
People educated at Hackney Downs School
20th-century English male actors
20th-century English singers
British male comedy actors
20th-century British male singers